Highway 690 is a highway in the north-eastern region of the Canadian province of Saskatchewan that connects Highway 23 near Arborfield to Highway 789.

Travel route 
Highway 690 begins at Arborfield in the RM of Arborfield No. 456 and extends north-east  to Highway 789 in the RM of Moose Range No. 486. At km 0.0, travel is eastward. At km 12.1, it turns east. This point is just south of Jordan River  Highway 690 continues east until Km 18.5 when it again travels north.

Intersections

See also 
Roads in Saskatchewan
Transportation in Saskatchewan

References 

690